Tommaso Pollace (1748 – 1830) was an Italian painter of the Neoclassical style, active mainly in Sicily.

Biography
He was born in Palermo, but died in Caltanissetta. He trained in Palermo in the circle of Vito d'Anna. His first paintings were for the Mother Church of Alcamo. In 1782, he began painting in a studio at Termini Imerese painting in Palermo for churches and for the Palazzo Celestri di Santacroce on Via Maqueda, and the Marchese of Santacroce's Villa di Mezzomonreale, now a military hospital. Pollace painted a Martyrdom of St John the Evangelist for the church of Santa Maria di Gesù in Petralia Soprana.

The competition in Palermo from other artists including Francesco Manno, Elia Interguglielmi, and Grano prompted him to obtain commissions in the 19th century at Scicli, Modica, Ragusa, Mazzarino, Barrafranca, Gangi, Agira, and San Cataldo.

References

1748 births
1830 deaths
18th-century Italian painters
Italian male painters
19th-century Italian painters
Painters from Palermo
19th-century Italian male artists
18th-century Italian male artists